Maganga also known as Maganaa, Maganga, and Magansa is a Village in the Salima District of Malawi.

References

Populated places in Central Region, Malawi